The Hill Times is a Canadian twice-weekly newspaper and daily news website, published in Ottawa, Ontario, which covers the Parliament of Canada, the federal government, and other federal political news. Founded in 1989 by Ross Dickson and Jim Creskey, the editor is Kate Malloy.

The publication features political news items and public policy briefings, lists, surveys, feature stories, profiles, opinion columns, and analysis.

Sister publications
In 1993, Hill Times Publishing launched sister title Ottawa XPress, an alternative weekly newspaper, to serve Ottawa audiences. The publication was sold to Communications Voir in 2001.

In 2004, the owners of The Hill Times also launched Embassy, a separate magazine which covered diplomatic affairs. Publication of Embassy was discontinued in 2016, with its coverage incorporated into an expanded Hill Times.

References

External links
 

1989 establishments in Ontario
Political mass media in Canada
Newspapers published in Ottawa
Newspapers established in 1989
Weekly newspapers published in Ontario
Biweekly newspapers published in Canada